Nalong (Turuturutu Narongi) is a South Korean animation, also known by the name Nalong, Fly To The Sky. It is a product of the major anime broadcaster Munhwa Broadcasting Corporation, and the animation was done by the now defunct Studio Kaab. The story centers on the animal character Nalong, a flying squirrel.

Story

Somewhere in this world, there is a town named Lala in a forest called Lulu. This is the home of Nalong and many other furry little creatures.

Nalong lives with his father and 10 brothers, and attends elementary school. His friends are an otter named Ukkya, an ostrich named Tajori, and the Mandu brothers, who were accidentally made by the famous inventor Professor Penguil.

Characters
The central characters of Nalong's Family are:

Nalong, Nalong's father (Dalbong), 10 Brothers, Blue Eagle, Panji, Panji's father, Hobi, Tori, Riri, Ukkya, Ukkya's mother, Ukkya's father, Sungsung, Sungsung's mother, Tajori, Tajori's mother, Tajori's father, Ujuin, Penguil, and the Dumpling brothers.

Production Staff
Director: Kim Keum Soo
Producers: An Seong Eun, Cheon Chae Jeong
Art Director: Kim Hae Seong
Scenario: Hwang Seok Yeon
Continuity: Kooji Aritomi
Marketing: Kim Sin Hwa
Main Marketer: Koo Cheol Hoi
Network: Euro Pictures, Poly Sound
Business Networks: Iconix Entertainment, Wiz Entertainment, Zero One Pictures, Ani Cast

Voice actors
Nalong: Kim Seo-yeong
Sungsung: Kim Youngsun
Ukkya, Tori: Woo Jeong-sin
Hobi, Riri: Ryu Jeom-hee
Penguil: Lee Cheol-yong
Nalong's father (Dalbong): Choi Han
Panji, Tajori, Ukkya's mother: Yeo Min-jeong
Ujuin: Um Sang-hyun

See also
Nalong 2 - Nalong Season 2

External links
Nalong homepage 
Studio Kaab homepage - Nalong Animator
Koo Cheol-hee homepage - Nalong's Diary Maker

2000s South Korean animated television series
2004 South Korean television series debuts
2006 South Korean television series endings
South Korean children's animated television series
MBC TV original programming
Animated television series about squirrels
Animated television series about families